The 2017–18 UEFA Champions League group stage began on 12 September and ended on 6 December 2017. A total of 32 teams competed in the group stage to decide the 16 places in the knockout phase of the 2017–18 UEFA Champions League.

Draw
The draw for the group stage was held on 24 August 2017, 18:00 CEST, at the Grimaldi Forum in Monaco.

The 32 teams were drawn into eight groups of four, with the restriction that teams from the same association could not be drawn against each other. For the draw, the teams were seeded into four pots based on the following principles:
Pot 1 contained the title holders and the champions of the top seven associations based on their 2016 UEFA country coefficients. If the title holders were one of the champions of the top seven associations, the champions of the association ranked eighth were also seeded into Pot 1.
Pot 2, 3 and 4 contained the remaining teams, seeded based on their 2017 UEFA club coefficients.

On 17 July 2014, the UEFA emergency panel ruled that Ukrainian and Russian clubs would not be drawn against each other "until further notice" due to the political unrest between the countries.

Moreover, the draw was controlled for teams from the same association in order to split the teams evenly into the two sets of four groups (A–D, E–H) for maximum television coverage. On each matchday, one set of four groups played their matches on Tuesday, while the other set of four groups played their matches on Wednesday, with the two sets of groups alternating between each matchday.

The fixtures were decided after the draw, using a computer draw not shown to public, with the following match sequence (Regulations Article 16.02):

Note: Positions for scheduling did not use the seeding pots, e.g., Team 1 was not necessarily the team from Pot 1 in the draw.

There were certain scheduling restrictions: for example, teams from the same city (e.g., Real Madrid and Atlético Madrid) in general were not scheduled to play at home on the same matchday (to avoid teams from the same city playing at home on the same day or on consecutive days, due to logistics and crowd control), and teams in certain countries (e.g., Russia and Azerbaijan) were not scheduled to play at home on the last matchday (due to cold weather and simultaneous kick-off times).

Teams
Below were the participating teams (with their 2017 UEFA club coefficients), grouped by their seeding pot. They included 22 teams which enter in this stage, and the 10 winners of the play-off round (5 in Champions Route, 5 in League Route).

Notes

Format
In each group, teams played against each other home-and-away in a round-robin format. The group winners and runners-up advanced to the round of 16, while the third-placed teams entered the Europa League round of 32.

Tiebreakers

Teams were ranked according to points (3 points for a win, 1 point for a draw, 0 points for a loss), and if tied on points, the following tiebreaking criteria were applied, in the order given, to determine the rankings (Regulations Articles 17.01):
Points in head-to-head matches among tied teams;
Goal difference in head-to-head matches among tied teams;

Away goals scored in head-to-head matches among tied teams;
If more than two teams are tied, and after applying all head-to-head criteria above, a subset of teams are still tied, all head-to-head criteria above are reapplied exclusively to this subset of teams;
Goal difference in all group matches;
Goals scored in all group matches;
Away goals scored in all group matches;
Wins in all group matches;
Away wins in all group matches;
Disciplinary points (red card = 3 points, yellow card = 1 point, expulsion for two yellow cards in one match = 3 points);
UEFA club coefficient.

Groups
The matchdays were 12–13 September, 26–27 September, 17–18 October, 31 October – 1 November, 21–22 November, and 5–6 December 2017. The match kickoff times were 20:45 CEST/CET in general, except for certain matches for geographical reasons.

Times are CET/CEST, as listed by UEFA (local times are in parentheses).

Group A

Group B

Group C

Group D

Group E

Group F

Group G

Group H

Notes

References

External links
UEFA Champions League (official website)
UEFA Champions League history: 2017/18

Group Stage
2017-18
September 2017 sports events in Europe
October 2017 sports events in Europe
November 2017 sports events in Europe
December 2017 sports events in Europe